Feels Like Comin' Home is the "comeback" album by German heavy metal band Bonfire. It is the band's fifth album, released in 1996 on the independent label LZ Records, and featured the reunion of Bonfire. The album contains mostly English versions of the Glaub dran album by Lessmann/Ziller, and a German version of the album, Freudenfeuer, was released as well. Ex-Bonfire drummer Dominik Hülshorst contributed to the drums on the album.

Track listing

German track listing
The songs themselves had the same music as the English album but the lyrics are much different and do not correspond to the English songs.

Band members
Claus Lessmann - lead & backing vocals, acoustic guitar, bass
Hans Ziller - lead, rhythm & acoustic guitars, backing vocals

References
 Billboard's Listing of Feels Like Comin' Home Album

Bonfire (band) albums
1996 albums